Bratlie's Cabinet was a Norwegian cabinet, formed by a coalition of the Conservative Party and the Free-minded Liberal Party. It sat from 20 February 1912 to 31 January 1913.

Cabinet members

|}

References
Jens Bratlie's Government 20 February 1912 - 31 January 1913 - Government.no

Notes

Bratlie
Bratlie
Bratlie
1912 establishments in Norway
1913 disestablishments in Norway
Cabinets established in 1912
Cabinets disestablished in 1913